Ernst Heinrich Georg Ule (12 March 1854 – 15 July 1915) was a German botanist and plant collector.

Biography
He was born on 12 March 1854 in Halle an der Saale to science writer Otto Eduard Vincenz Ule (1820–1876). His brother was geographer Wilhelm Ule (1861–1940).
 
Originally trained as a gardener, and worked at the botanical gardens in Halle and Berlin. 
He then emigrated to Brazil in 1883, where he worked as a private tutor and botanical collector. Subsequently, he served as a naturalista viajante (traveling naturalist) at the National Museum in Rio de Janeiro, where he was appointed sub-director (1895), and later director, of the museum's botanical department.

From 1900 to 1903 he was engaged in botanical research in the Amazonas region of Brazil, during which time, he also conducted botanical investigations in neighbouring areas. After his return to Germany, he worked as a scientific assistant at the Berlin-Dahlem Botanical Garden and Museum (1913–14).

He died on 15 July 1915.

Legacy
Ule has several botanical genera named in his honor, such as:
 Uleanthus, named by Hermann Harms in 1905, family Fabaceae
 Ulearum, named by Adolf Engler in 1905, family Araceae
 Uleiella, named by J.Schröt. in 1894, fungi in family Uleiellaceae
 Uleiorchis, named by Frederico Carlos Hoehne in 1944, family Orchidaceae
 Uleobryum, named by Broth. in 1906, moss in family Pottiaceae
 Uleodendron, named by Stephan Rauschert in 1982, family Moraceae
 Uleodothis, named by Theiss. & Syd. in 1915, fungi in family Venturiaceae
 Uleophytum, named by Georg Hieronymus in 1907, family Asteraceae
 Uleomyces, named by Henn. in 1895, fungi in family Cookellaceae
 Uleomycina, named by Petr. in 1954, fungi in family Elsinoaceae
 Uleothyrium, named by Petr. in 1929, fungi in  family Asterinaceae

Selected writings 
 Kautschukgewinnung und Kautschukhandel am Amazonenstrome, 1906 – Rubber production and trade in the Amazon. 
 Das Innere von Nordost-Brasilien, 1908 – The interior of northeast Brazil.
 Kautshukgewinnung und Kautschukhandel in Bahia, 1908 – Rubber production and trade in Bahia. 
 Biologische Beobachtungen im Amazonasgebiet, 1915 – Biological observations in the Amazon.

References 

19th-century German botanists
People from Halle (Saale)
1915 deaths
1854 births
German emigrants to Brazil